James Floyd Breeding (September 28, 1901 – October 17, 1977) was a U.S. Representative from Kansas.

Early life 

Born near Robinson, Kansas, Breeding was educated in grade schools, Moonlight, Kansas, and Berryton High School in Shawnee County, Kansas. He attended Kansas State College at Manhattan in 1921 and 1922. He moved to Rolla, Kansas, in 1928. Farmer-stockman near Rolla, Morton County from 1928 to 1956. He served as member of State house of representatives 1947-1949, serving as minority leader in 1949 session. He served as Democratic nominee for Lieutenant Governor of Kansas in 1950. He served as president of Western Kansas Development Association in 1951. He served as delegate to the Democratic National Conventions in 1960 and 1964.

Breeding was elected as a Democrat to the Eighty-fifth and to the two succeeding Congresses (January 3, 1957 – January 3, 1963). He was an unsuccessful candidate for reelection in 1962 to the Eighty-eighth Congress, after his Fifth District in southwest Kansas was merged with Bob Dole's Sixth District in northwest Kansas. He was appointed by President Kennedy as assistant to Secretary of Agriculture, Grain and Feed Division from 1963 to 1966. He was an unsuccessful candidate for election to the United States Senate in 1966. He died in Dodge City, Kansas on October 17, 1977. He was interred in Rolla Cemetery, Rolla, Kansas.

References

1901 births
1977 deaths
Democratic Party members of the Kansas House of Representatives
Democratic Party members of the United States House of Representatives from Kansas
20th-century American politicians
People from Brown County, Kansas